Peddintalludu is a 1991 Indian Telugu-language comedy film directed by Sarath. It stars Suman, Nagma, Mohan Babu, Vanisri with music composed by Raj–Koti. It is produced by T. R. Tulasi under the Sri Annapurna Cine Chitra banner. The film is a remake of the 1962 Hindi film Professor which had earlier been remade in Telugu in 1969 as Bhale Mastaru.

Plot 
Raja (Suman) is an unemployed educated guy, his mother (Dubbing Janaki) is a serious heart patient and requires a major operation. But due to poverty, Raja decides to shift to Hyderabad for his mother's treatment and in search of a job. On the way, he meets a retired music teacher Srinivasa Rao (Babu Mohan) on a train who is traveling going to join as a tuition master Island Estate for Rs. 3000 salary monthly. While alighting with the suitcases of Raja & Srinivasa Rao interchanges. After reaching the room, Raja finds the appointment letter and address cover of Srinivasa Rao. Due to the critical situation of his mother, Raja joins the post as a disguise old man.

Bala Tripura Sundari (Vanisri), proprietor of Island Estate is a lady Hitler, she is the guardian of her expired brother's four naughty children Geeta (Nagma), Radha (Seema), Tinku (Master Amith) and Pinky (Baby Vijayalakshmi). So Bala Tripura Sundari keeps Srinivasa Rao as their caretaker & teacher. Now Raja splits him into two, by introducing himself as Srinivasa Rao's brother's son and starts loving Geeta and always praises Bala Tripura Sundari in the old avatar to get her appreciation. Once when Raja is changing his getups a thief Goodala Kanna Rao (Mohan Babu) catches red-handed, starts blackmailing and settles along with him as his brother-in-law. Meanwhile, Bala Tripura Sundari learns that Srinivasa Rao is having Kuja Dosham a horoscope, people who are having it should marry the person having the same otherwise, the respective partner will die. Due to which Bala Tripura Sundari is also not get married. So, she starts loving Srinivasa Rao and decides to marry him. The rest of the story is a humorous comedy-drama about how Raja gets rid of these problems.

Cast 
Suman as Raja
Nagma as Geeta
Mohan Babu as Goodala Kanna Rao
Vanisri as Bala Tripura Sundari
Pratap Chandran as Viswanatham
Babu Mohan as Srinivasa Rao
Bhimeswara Rao as I.G.
K. K. Sarma as Head Constable Venkataswamy
Potti Prasad as Lakshman Rao
Chidatala Appa Rao as Constable
Dham as Constable
Dubbing Janaki as Raja's mother
Seema as Radha
Master Amith as Tinku
Baby Vijayalakshmi as Pinky

Music 

Music was composed by Raj–Koti. Lyrics were written by Veturi. Music released on R.K. Recording Company.

References

External links 
 

Indian comedy films
Telugu remakes of Hindi films
Films directed by Sarath
Films scored by Raj–Koti
1991 comedy films
1991 films
1990s Telugu-language films